Mathews v. Eldridge, 424 U.S. 319 (1976), is a case in which the United States Supreme Court held that individuals have a statutorily granted property right in Social Security benefits, and the termination of such benefits implicates due process but does not require a pre-termination hearing. The case is significant in the development of American administrative law.

Legal principles
Determining the constitutional sufficiency of administrative procedures, prior to the initial termination of benefits and pending review, requires consideration of three factors:
The interests of the individual in retaining their property and the injury threatened by the official action;
The risk of error through the procedures used and probable value, if any, of additional or substitute procedural safeguards;
The costs and administrative burden of the additional process, and the interests of the government in efficient adjudication.

The Court determined that Social Security benefits are a statutorily-created property right and so implicate due process.

However, after balancing the three factors, the Court ruled that the administrative procedures in place were constitutional and held that termination of Social Security benefits does not require a pre-termination hearing. See Matthews v. Eldridge, 424 U.S. 319, 347-49 (1976).

Background
The Social Security Administration  terminated Eldridge's benefits by its normal procedures. However, Eldridge was not provided with a hearing before the termination of his benefits in which he could argue for a continuation of the benefits. He sued even though he had not exhausted his post-termination administrative remedies. The district court held that the termination was unconstitutional, and the court of appeals affirmed.

Decision
The Supreme Court reversed and held that pre-termination hearing was not required.

See also
 List of United States Supreme Court cases, volume 424
 Goldberg v. Kelly (1970)

External links

United States civil due process case law
United States administrative case law
United States Supreme Court cases
1976 in United States case law
Social Security lawsuits
United States Supreme Court cases of the Burger Court